The 1994 Vanavara air disaster occurred on 26 September 1994 when a Yakovlev Yak-40, operated by Russian regional airliner Cheremshanka Airlines, crashed onto the bank of a river near Vanavara, Russia. All 24 passengers and 4 crew members died.

The Russian investigation team concluded that pilot error was the cause of the crash. Poor weather conditions had required the flight to abort several landing attempts and the air crew failed to maintain awareness of the fuel quantity. This resulted in the aircraft crashing due to fuel exhaustion. 

Subsequently, the investigation team blamed the airport for "not reporting the weather condition" in a timely manner to the crew.

Aircraft
The aircraft involved was a Yakovlev Yak-40 which bore a Russian registration of RA-87468.  The airliner was manufactured in Saratov Aviation Plant on 11 November 1974 with a serial number of 9441337. It was re-registered as CCCP-87468 and was handed over to the Ministry of Civil Aviation of the USSR. On November 16 the aircraft was sent to the Kazakh Civil Aviation Administration. Fourteen years later, on 16 November 1988, the 87468 was operated by the Krasnoyarsk Civil Aviation Administration. Cheremshanka Airlines later retrieved the Yak-40 in 1993.

The total operating time of the aircraft was 22,203 flight hours and a flight cycle of 17,220 cycles.

Flight
The flight was operated by Cheremshanka Airlines, a regional airline based at Krasnoyark Cheremshanka Airport. At the time of the accident, the Yakovlev Yak-40 was carrying 24 passengers, including 21 adults and 3 children, and 4 crew members. The pilot of the flight was Captain Anatoliy A. Danilov and the co-pilot was First Officer Anatoliy G. Shcherbakov. Also on board was a flight mechanic Mikhail N. Shurpatov and one flight attendant.

Weather conditions had begun to deteriorate while the aircraft was en route to Tura Airport, but ATC in Tura failed to inform the flight crew of the changing conditions. The crew were therefore caught unaware by the poor weather when they arrived in Tura. Due to the limited visibility, the crew missed the airport. After three failed landing attempts, the crew decided to divert to Vanavara airfield, a small airport some 453 kilometers away from Tura Airport.

41 kilometers from Vanavara, at an altitude of 3,000 meters, the airliner's engines flamed out as the fuel supply was exhausted. The crew then decided to make an emergency landing in a swamp. Two helicopters and an An-24 aircraft were trying to help, suggesting the Yak-40's direction to the swamp where it would be possible to make an emergency landing. The crew then decided to land on the bank of the Chamba River.

Captain Danilov ordered First Officer Shcherbakov and the flight mechanic Shurpatov to look out from the window and see if they could find the Chamba River. The landing gear was extended by the crew started its initial descent. At a speed of 235 km/h, the aircraft sheared tree tops and the right wing detached from the airframe. The Yak-40 then rolled severely to the right and crashed into the bank of the Chamba River inverted, with the front portion in the water and the empennage resting on shore. There was no explosion or fire since the aircraft had run out of fuel, but the impact was not survivable. All 28 people on board died.

Footage from the crash site, taken from a helicopter, showed that the cockpit of the Yak-40 was completely destroyed. The fuselage was crushed severely while the tail was relatively intact. Crash victims, along with their belongings, were strewn in a large grassy area near the wreckage.

Investigation
The investigation was hampered by the fact that the recording of the crew's conversation with ATC at Tura Airport was somehow lost before the official investigation began.  A.M Chernov, the owner of Cheremshanka Airlines, ordered that before the records were transferred to the investigation team, he should listen to them first. After the records were transferred to the Russian investigation team, the recordings were not to be found, which could indicate possible sabotage by Chernov.

The investigation found that there were several serious shortcomings in the organization of flight work at Cheremshanka Airlines, as well as in the flight safety culture in the air traffic control at Tura Airport. Employees of Tura ATC wrote letters and at trade union meetings raised the issue that disorganization and the lack of a safety culture were endemic at Tura ATC. However, management of the Tura Aviation Enterprise did not eliminate these shortcomings, and the Krasnoyarsk regional air transport department did not control its work properly.

Conclusion from Russian investigative team
The commission investigating the incident concluded that the catastrophe occurred due to a number of factors:

 The crew incorrectly calculated the fuel supply required for the flight
 The duty navigator of Cheremshanka Airport, V.A. Tsurikov, did not properly prepare the crew for the flight
 The dispatcher did not inform the crew in a timely manner about the sharp deterioration of weather at Tura Airport
 With a shortage of fuel on board, the crew chose to divert to Vanavara, which was over four hundred kilometers away, when Baykit airfield was a hundred kilometers closer (354 kilometers)
 When approaching in Vanavara, the crew incorrectly chose the flight level, as well as the point of the beginning of the descent

References

External links
 Crash site of the disaster, taken from a helicopter

Aviation accidents and incidents in 1994
Aviation accidents and incidents in Russia
Accidents and incidents involving the Yakovlev Yak-40